John Harper Narbeth, CB, CBE, MVO (26 May 1863 – 19 May 1944) was a British naval architect of the Royal Corps of Naval Constructors, the body responsible for the design of Royal Navy warships.

Notes

1863 births
1944 deaths
Companions of the Order of the Bath
Commanders of the Order of the British Empire
Members of the Royal Victorian Order
British naval architects